Shoeburyness Carriage Servicing Depot is an Electric Traction Depot located in Shoeburyness, Essex, England. The depot is situated on the London, Tilbury and Southend line and is near Shoeburyness station. To the east of the depot is MoD Shoeburyness and there used to be a rail connection into that site from the depot.

Steam Era Shed
Prior to the electrification of the LTSR in the late 1950s/early 1960s a steam engine shed was located at Shoeburyness. The line opened in 1884 and the shed five years later when the shed at Southend was closed. The shed was located on the north side of the station and had two roads and was extended in 1896 and a third track added (with a lean to timber shed) in 1898. Additional sidings space for coaling and locomotives was provided in the 1900s.

The shed was closed on 18 June 1962 and demolished soon after.

The existing facility occupies the site of the former carriage sidings.

Allocation 
As of 2022, the depot's allocation consists of c2c Class 357 EMUs.

References 

Railway depots in England